Melo may refer to:

People:
Melo (nickname)
Melo (surname), a Portuguese surname
Melo (Italian) or Melus of Bari, 11th century Apulian aristocrat

Places:
 Melo, Córdoba, a settlement in the Presidente Roque Sáenz Peña Department, Argentina
 Melo, Uruguay, the capital city of the Cerro Largo Department of north-eastern Uruguay
 Roman Catholic Diocese of Melo, Uruguay
 Melo, a parish of Gouveia Municipality, Portugal
Melo Island in Guinea-Bissau, West Africa

Other uses:
 Mélo (play), a 1929 play by Henri Bernstein
 Mélo (film), a 1986 French romantic drama film, based on the play
Melo language, spoken in Ethiopia
Melo (gastropod), a genus of very large sea snails
Cucumis or melo, a genus of twining, tendril-bearing plants

See also
Mello (disambiguation)
Mellow (disambiguation)